Essex was an electoral district of the Legislative Assembly of the Parliament of the Province of Canada, in Canada West, at the south-western tip of the Ontario Peninsula. It was created in 1841, upon the establishment of the Province of Canada by the union of Upper Canada and Lower Canada. Essex was represented by one member in the Legislative Assembly.  It was abolished in 1867, upon the creation of Canada and the province of Ontario.

Boundaries 

Essex electoral district was located at the southwestern tip of the Ontario Peninsula.  It was based on the boundaries of Essex County, in Canada West (now the province of Ontario).

The Union Act, 1840 had merged the two provinces of Upper Canada and Lower Canada into the Province of Canada, with a single Parliament.  The separate parliaments of Lower Canada and Upper Canada were abolished.Union Act, 1840, 3 & 4 Vict., c. 35, s. 2.  The Union Act provided that the pre-existing electoral boundaries of Upper Canada would continue to be used in the new Parliament, unless altered by the Union Act itself.

Essex County had been an electoral district in the Legislative Assembly of Upper Canada, and its boundaries were not altered by the Act. Those boundaries had originally been set by a proclamation of the first Lieutenant Governor of Upper Canada, John Graves Simcoe, in 1792:

The boundaries had been further defined by a statute of Upper Canada in 1798:

Since Essex electoral district was not changed by the Union Act, those boundaries continued to be used for the new electoral district. Essex was represented by one member in the Legislative Assembly.

Members of the Legislative Assembly 

Essex was represented by one member in the Legislative Assembly. The following were the members for Essex:

Abolition 

The district was abolished on July 1, 1867, when the British North America Act, 1867 came into force, creating Canada and splitting the Province of Canada into Quebec and Ontario.  It was succeeded by electoral districts of the same name in the House of Commons of Canada and the Legislative Assembly of Ontario.

References 

.

  Electoral districts of Canada West